The 1919 VPI Gobblers football team represented Virginia Polytechnic Institute in the 1919 college football season. The team was led by their head coach Charles Bernier and finished with a record of five wins and four losses (5–4).

Schedule

Game summaries

Hampden–Sydney

The starting lineup for VPI was: J. Hardwick (left end), Hall (left tackle), Armstrong (left guard), Parrish (center), Shaner (right guard), Tilson (right tackle), Davis (right end), Crisp (quarterback), Graham (left halfback), Godsey (right halfback), Redd (fullback).The substitutes were: Brooks, Farmer, H. Hardwick, Kornegay, Lancaster, McCann, Pierce and Rice.

Richmond

The starting lineup for VPI was: J. Hardwick (left end), Hall (left tackle), Armstrong (left guard), Parrish (center), Shaner (right guard), Tilson (right tackle), Washington (right end), Crisp (quarterback), Graham (left halfback), Godsey (right halfback), Lancaster (fullback).The substitutes were: Brooks, Davis, Farmer, H. Hardwick, Hutcheson, Kornegay, McCann, Pierce, Rice and Shepherd.

Georgetown

The starting lineup for VPI was: J. Hardwick (left end), Hall (left tackle), Armstrong (left guard), H. Hardwick (center), Shaner (right guard), Tilson (right tackle), Davis (right end), Crisp (quarterback), Graham (left halfback), Godsey (right halfback), Redd (fullback).The substitutes were: Brooks, Farmer, Kornegay, Lancaster, Pierce, Rice and Shepherd.

Maryland State

The starting lineup for VPI was: J. Hardwick (left end), Pierce (left tackle), Armstrong (left guard), H. Hardwick (center), Shaner (right guard), Crisp (right tackle), McConkey (right end), Lancaster (quarterback), Graham (left halfback), McCann (right halfback), Redd (fullback).The substitutes were: Chapman, Farmer, Kornegay and Tilson.

Washington and Lee

The starting lineup for VPI was: J. Hardwick (left end), Hall (left tackle), Armstrong (left guard), H. Hardwick (center), Shaner (right guard), Crisp (right tackle), Parrish (right end), Lancaster (quarterback), Graham (left halfback), Godsey (right halfback), Redd (fullback).The substitutes were: Chapman, McCann, Pierce, Tilson and Washington.

Wake Forest

The starting lineup for VPI was: J. Hardwick (left end), Hall (left tackle), Armstrong (left guard), H. Hardwick (center), Shaner (right guard), Pierce (right tackle), McCann (right end), Crisp (quarterback), Graham (left halfback), Lancaster (right halfback), Redd (fullback).The substitutes were: Brooks, Farmer, Kornegay, Parrish and Tilson.

NC State

The starting lineup for VPI was: J. Hardwick (left end), Hall (left tackle), Armstrong (left guard), H. Hardwick (center), Shaner (right guard), Pierce (right tackle), Washington (right end), Crisp (quarterback), Graham (left halfback), Lancaster (right halfback), Redd (fullback).The substitutes were: Brooks, Copenhaver, Godsey, Parrish and Tilson.

Emory and Henry

The starting lineup for VPI was: Chapman (left end), Farmer (left tackle), Sherertz (left guard), Shaner (center), Saunders (right guard), McConkey (right tackle), Washington (right end), McCann (quarterback), Walters (left halfback), Brooks (right halfback), Glaze (fullback).The substitutes were: Crisp, Gay, Graham, Lancaster, Newman, Redd, Rice and Wills.

VMI

The starting lineup for VPI was: Camper (left end), Hall (left tackle), Armstrong (left guard), H. Hardwick (center), J. Hardwick (right guard), Pierce (right tackle), Parrish (right end), Crisp (quarterback), Redd (left halfback), Lancaster (right halfback), McCann (fullback).The substitutes were: Brooks, Farmer, Godsey, Graham, Shaner and Tilson.

Players
The following players were members of the 1919 football team according to the roster published in the 1920 edition of The Bugle, the Virginia Tech yearbook.

References

VPI
Virginia Tech Hokies football seasons
VPI Gobblers football